Cosmo Ace, formerly A Whale and Madison Orca, is a Liberian-flagged ore-oil carrier built in 2010 by Hyundai Heavy Industries, Ulsan, South Korea for TMT Co. Ltd. (formerly Taiwan Maritime Transport Co. Ltd.) from the Republic of China (Taiwan). She has seven other sister ships in the fleet, built in 2010-2011 and named in succession: B Whale, C Whale etc., to H Whale.

Oil skimming experiments
She was refitted and converted in Portugal into a skimmer to assist in the cleanup of the BP Deepwater Horizon oil spill in Gulf of Mexico, near the Mississippi River Delta, Louisiana. The ship's owners stated that A Whale is capable of separating  of oil per day, while storing the crude and returning the processed sea water to the sea.

A Whale arrived in the Gulf of Mexico on 30 June 2010, while financial agreements were yet pending. However, in two weeks of testing A Whale collected virtually no oil. TMT stated that the ship's poor performance was due to the dispersion of oil in the Gulf.

On July 16, the Coast Guard announced it would not be authorized to join the containment process because tests had shown that its oil skimming capabilities were "negligible" in comparison to the other more nimble and much smaller skimmers in the containment.

Service history

In early 2013, the A Whale became stranded due to a technical problem off Suez. The ship's crew remained stranded for six months without pay, exacerbated by owner TMT's bankruptcy filing in June, before eventually receiving supplies and some of their backpay in July. That August the ship was allegedly fired on by Libyan Marine Special Forces, according to a video posted on their Facebook page, as it attempted to enter the Es Sider terminal.

In 2014 the ship was renamed to Madison Orca and transferred to Monarch Vessel Holdings Corporation. As of December 2020, operated by Suntech Maritime, it is in active service as the Cosmo Ace.

See also
List of world's longest ships
Deepwater Horizon explosion

References

External links
 Cosmo Ace (IMO: 9424209) at VesselTracker

Oil tankers
Ships built by Hyundai Heavy Industries Group
Deepwater Horizon oil spill
2010 ships